This is a list of 173 species in Eugnamptus, a genus of leaf and bud weevils in the family Attelabidae.

Eugnamptus species

 Eugnamptus abdominalis Voss, 1941 c
 Eugnamptus adjectus Voss, 1937 c
 Eugnamptus affinis Voss, 1941 c
 Eugnamptus amurensis Faust, 1889 c
 Eugnamptus angustatus (Herbst, 1797) i c g b
 Eugnamptus antennalis Sharp, 1889 c
 Eugnamptus apicalis Faust, 1892 c
 Eugnamptus apicipennis Voss, 1961 c
 Eugnamptus atratulus Voss, 1941 c
 Eugnamptus atriceps Voss, 1941 c
 Eugnamptus atripennis Voss, 1941 c
 Eugnamptus aurifrons Roelofs, 1874 c
 Eugnamptus bakeri Voss, 1941 c
 Eugnamptus balius Hamilton & Novinger g
 Eugnamptus basalis Sharp, 1889 c
 Eugnamptus bellus Hamilton & Novinger g
 Eugnamptus bicolor Legalov, 2003 c
 Eugnamptus bifenestratus Faust, 1892 c
 Eugnamptus bimaculosus Voss, 1939 c
 Eugnamptus bolivianus Voss, 1941 c
 Eugnamptus brevicollis Sharp, 1889 c
 Eugnamptus cervinus Voss, 1930 c
 Eugnamptus cinctus Sharp, 1889 c b
 Eugnamptus collaris Schoenh., 1839 c
 Eugnamptus congestus Voss, 1941 c
 Eugnamptus cornutus Sharp, 1889 c
 Eugnamptus decemsatus Scudder, S.H., 1878 c g
 Eugnamptus deporaoides Voss, 1941 c
 Eugnamptus diabroticus Sharp, 1889 c
 Eugnamptus dibaphus Voss, 1942 c
 Eugnamptus dimidiatus Voss, 1941 c
 Eugnamptus dispar Sharp, 1889 c
 Eugnamptus distinctus Kono, 1930 c
 Eugnamptus diversus Voss, 1949 c
 Eugnamptus divisus Sharp, 1889 c
 Eugnamptus dubius Voss, 1949 c
 Eugnamptus elongatus Voss, 1941 c
 Eugnamptus excisipes Voss, 1941 c
 Eugnamptus exiguum Voss, c
 Eugnamptus flavicornis Voss, 1922 c
 Eugnamptus flavidus Faust, 1898 c
 Eugnamptus flavinasis Voss, 1941 c
 Eugnamptus flavinasus Boheman, 1845 c
 Eugnamptus flavipes Sharp, 1889 c
 Eugnamptus flavirostris Voss, 1941 c
 Eugnamptus fragilis Sharp, 1889 c
 Eugnamptus fukienensis Voss, 1942 c
 Eugnamptus furvus Marshall, 1948 c
 Eugnamptus fuscipes Pierce, 1913 c
 Eugnamptus germanus Sharp, 1890 c
 Eugnamptus giganteus Legalov, 2003 c
 Eugnamptus godmani Sharp, 1890 c
 Eugnamptus gracilicornis Dalla Torre & Voss, 1937 c
 Eugnamptus gracilipes Voss, 1941 c
 Eugnamptus gracilis Voss, 1941 c
 Eugnamptus grandaevus Voss, 1941 c
 Eugnamptus grandiceps Voss, 1957 c
 Eugnamptus grisescens Voss, 1945 c
 Eugnamptus grisesceus Voss, c
 Eugnamptus herediensis Hamilton & Novinger g
 Eugnamptus hirsutus Voss, 1924 c
 Eugnamptus hirtellus Sharp, 1889 c
 Eugnamptus inclusus Voss, 1939 c
 Eugnamptus instabilis Voss, 1941 c
 Eugnamptus insularis Dalla Torre & Voss, 1937 c
 Eugnamptus interruptus Voss, 1941 c
 Eugnamptus ixigerum Voss, 1941 c
 Eugnamptus kazantsevi Legalov, 2003 c
 Eugnamptus kuatunensis Voss, 1949 c
 Eugnamptus kubani Alonso-Zarazaga in Löbl & Smetana (eds.), 2011 c
 Eugnamptus lacunosus Voss, 1949 c
 Eugnamptus laticeps Voss, 1941 c
 Eugnamptus latifrons Sharp, 1889 c
 Eugnamptus latirostris Sharp, 1889 c
 Eugnamptus lituratus Voss, 1941 c
 Eugnamptus longicollis Voss, 1941 c
 Eugnamptus longipes Sharp, 1889 c
 Eugnamptus longiusculus Hamilton & Novinger g
 Eugnamptus longulus Sharp, 1889 c
 Eugnamptus maculatus Sharp, 1889 c
 Eugnamptus maculifer Voss, 1945 c
 Eugnamptus manshinsis Legalov, 2003 c
 Eugnamptus marginatus Pasc., 1883 c
 Eugnamptus marginellus Faust, 1898 c
 Eugnamptus medvedevi Legalov, 2003 c
 Eugnamptus minuta Voss, 1945 c
 Eugnamptus mirabilis Legalov, 2003 c
 Eugnamptus monchadskii Legalov, 2007 c
 Eugnamptus morimotoi Nakane, 1963 c
 Eugnamptus morio Voss, 1945 c
 Eugnamptus niger Sharp, 1889 c
 Eugnamptus nigriceps Voss, 1932 c
 Eugnamptus nigricornis Sharp, 1889 c
 Eugnamptus nigrinipennis Voss, 1941 c
 Eugnamptus nigrinipes Voss, 1945 c
 Eugnamptus nigrinus Dalla Torre & Voss, 1937 c
 Eugnamptus nigripennis Sharp, 1889 c
 Eugnamptus nigripes Melsh. & Pierce, 1913 c
 Eugnamptus nigriventris Schaeffer, 1905 i c b
 Eugnamptus nigrocapitus Legalov, 2007 c
 Eugnamptus nigropectoralis Voss, 1945 c
 Eugnamptus nigroruber Legalov, 2007 c
 Eugnamptus notatus Voss, 1941 c
 Eugnamptus nuda Voss, 1945 c
 Eugnamptus obscurus Sharp, 1889 c
 Eugnamptus palleolus Voss, 1939 c
 Eugnamptus pallidus Schaeffer, 1908 i c b
 Eugnamptus pannosus Marshall, 1948 c
 Eugnamptus pardalis Marshall, 1948 c
 Eugnamptus parvulus Voss, 1941 c
 Eugnamptus pedestris Voss, 1949 c
 Eugnamptus piceus Voss, 1941 c
 Eugnamptus picticollis Sharp, 1890 c
 Eugnamptus pilosellus Voss, 1941 c
 Eugnamptus plebeius Sharp, 1890 c
 Eugnamptus pseudonigriventris Hamilton, 1990 i g
 Eugnamptus punctatus Pierce, 1913 i c b
 Eugnamptus puncticeps LeConte, 1876 i c b
 Eugnamptus punctiger Voss, 1941 c
 Eugnamptus pusillus Hamilton & Novinger g
 Eugnamptus quadrimaculatus Voss, 1945 c
 Eugnamptus rostralis Hamilton & Novinger g
 Eugnamptus ruber Legalov, 2003 c
 Eugnamptus rubricollis Dalla Torre & Voss, 1937 c
 Eugnamptus rudis Legalov, 2007 c
 Eugnamptus ruficeps Pierce, 1913 c
 Eugnamptus ruficollis Dalla Torre & Voss, 1937 c
 Eugnamptus rufifrons Sharp, 1889 c
 Eugnamptus rufipennis Marshall, 1948 c
 Eugnamptus rusticus Legalov, 2003 c
 Eugnamptus salvini Sharp, 1889 c
 Eugnamptus sanguinolentus Voss, 1939 c
 Eugnamptus sarapiquensis Hamilton & Novinger g
 Eugnamptus sauteri Voss, 1921 c
 Eugnamptus semipurpurea Voss, 1941 c
 Eugnamptus semivittatus Sharp, 1889 c
 Eugnamptus seriatus Sharp, 1889 c
 Eugnamptus sexmaculatus Sharp, 1889 c
 Eugnamptus sexpunctatus Voss, 1945 c
 Eugnamptus sheilae Hamilton, 1990 i g
 Eugnamptus sitshuanensis Legalov, 2003 c
 Eugnamptus striatus LeConte, 1876 i c
 Eugnamptus subcarinulatus Voss, 1945 c
 Eugnamptus subcoeruleifrons Voss, 1939 c
 Eugnamptus subcuprea Voss, 1945 c
 Eugnamptus subpurpureus Voss, 1941 c
 Eugnamptus sulcatus Voss, 1941 c
 Eugnamptus sulcicollis Hamilton & Novinger g
 Eugnamptus sulcifrons Gyllenhal, 1839 c
 Eugnamptus sumatranensis Legalov, 2007 c
 Eugnamptus suturalis Sharp, 1889 c
 Eugnamptus tahorinensis Voss, 1922 c
 Eugnamptus taihorinensis Voss, 1941 c
 Eugnamptus tenuicollis Pascoe, 1885 c
 Eugnamptus tessellatus Voss, 1941 c
 Eugnamptus testaceipennis Voss, 1941 c
 Eugnamptus testaceus Pierce, 1910 c
 Eugnamptus tibialis Sharp, 1889 c
 Eugnamptus trinotatus Voss, 1941 c
 Eugnamptus tropicus Kirsch, 1874 c
 Eugnamptus truncatus Sharp, 1889 c
 Eugnamptus tucumanensis Voss, 1957 c
 Eugnamptus validus Sharp, 1889 c
 Eugnamptus variabilis Voss, 1945 c
 Eugnamptus varicolor Voss, 1941 c
 Eugnamptus varius Sharp, 1889 c
 Eugnamptus vicinus Voss, 1941 c
 Eugnamptus vietnamensis Legalov, 2003 c
 Eugnamptus violaceiceps Voss, 1939 c
 Eugnamptus viridiana Voss, 1941 c
 Eugnamptus viridirostris Voss, 1924 c
 Eugnamptus yunnanensis Voss, 1941 c
 Eugnamptus zhejiangensis Legalov, 2003 c

Data sources: i = ITIS, c = Catalogue of Life, g = GBIF, b = Bugguide.net

References

Eugnamptus
Articles created by Qbugbot